Flame of the West is a 1945 American Western film directed by Lambert Hillyer and starring Johnny Mack Brown, Raymond Hatton and Joan Woodbury.

Cast
 Johnny Mack Brown as Dr. John Poole
 Raymond Hatton as Add Youman
 Joan Woodbury as 	Poppy Rand
 Douglass Dumbrille as 	Marshal Tom Nightlander
 Lynne Carver as Abbie Compton
 Tom Quinn as 	Ed - Bartender
 Harry Woods as Wilson 
 Ray Bennett as Henchman Rocky 
 Riley Hill as Midland - Cowhand
 Jack Ingram as Slick - Henchman
 John Merton as Carl Compton
 Jack Rockwell as Bill Knott - Rancher
 Steve Clark as Hendricks - Rancher

References

Bibliography
 Pitts, Michael R. Western Movies: A Guide to 5,105 Feature Films. McFarland, 2012.

External links
 

1945 films
1945 Western (genre) films
American Western (genre) films
Films directed by Lambert Hillyer
Monogram Pictures films
1940s English-language films
1940s American films